The Cultural Arts Council of Sonoma County (or the Arts Council of Sonoma County) was the official Sonoma County, California, USA arts council. The council, which functioned for 26 years, was a partner of the California Arts Council. In 2002, the organization went by the Arts Council of Sonoma County, but never legally changed its name. In mid-October 2013, the Council dismissed all staff and suspended operations due to lack of funding.

References

Sonoma
Arts organizations based in the San Francisco Bay Area
Organizations based in Sonoma County, California
2013 disestablishments in California